Kim Wilde is the debut studio album by English singer Kim Wilde, released on 29 June 1981 by Rak Records. Fronted by the top 10 singles "Kids in America" and "Chequered Love" and greeted with a generally positive response from critics, the album launched Wilde into stardom and remains one of her most popular recordings.

Background and recording
The songs on the album were all written by Kim's father, the successful 1950s rock and roll singer Marty Wilde, and her younger brother Ricky Wilde. The symphonic rock band The Enid served as the backing band. According to Enid leader Robert John Godfrey, the Enid got along well with Wilde but were paid "a pittance" because the album was recorded in their studio. Production duties were fulfilled by Ricky Wilde. The cover portraits were taken by renowned British photographer Gered Mankowitz.

Musically, the album is mainly new wave and rock-oriented, but it also features a reggae track ("Everything We Know"), and a brass section appears on "2-6-5-8-0". Lyrically, Marty Wilde included love songs and also a song ("Water on Glass") about tinnitus (a medical condition that causes ringing in the ears), a song about the deterioration of inner cities ("Our Town") and a song about a theory that sound is alive ("Tuning in Tuning On").

Critical response

Kim Wilde received generally positive reviews from contemporary critics. Commending the mix of up-tempo and slower tracks as well as Wilde's versatility, Australian publication The Chronicle found "Water on Glass" to be "reminiscent of some of the early 60s rock" and highlighted "Our Town" as "one of the best tracks", comparing the subject matter to Simon & Garfunkel's "My Little Town". Donald Robertson of Roadrunner called the three singles "masterpieces" and concluded that the "pure pop" album was "fun to listen to when you're having fun". Eric Chappe called the album an "immediately striking disc", citing the "'60s girl group mannerisms" and "Spector-esque drum sound" of "Water on Glass" while drawing comparisons to both Dusty Springfield and Debbie Harry.

Writing for The Globe and Mail, Alan Niester again compared Wilde to Dusty Springfield and Debbie Harry, but called "2-6-5-8-0" and "You'll Never Be So Wrong" "extremely promising", describing the latter as "a moody and captivating ballad that stands head and shoulders above all the Blondie and Pat Benatar simulations." David Hepworth of Smash Hits sarcastically suggested "this is the best Blondie album for a couple of years" but expressed hope that the singer would assert herself more in the future. High Fidelitys Mitchell Cohen found Wilde's voice alternately "plaintive" and "shrill" but described the album as "entertaining" and "a lot of fun", again drawing comparisons to the music of the 1960s. Record Mirror critic Mike Nicholls praised Wilde's voice and individuality despite comparing the reggae-influenced "Everything We Know" to "The Tide Is High" by Blondie, released the previous year. Calling "Tuning in Tuning On" a "clever closer", Nicholls suggested that the track provided "requisite experimentation" and could indicate a new synth-driven direction for the singer; a prescient prediction with regards to the sound of her subsequent albums.

Kim Wilde entered the UK Albums Chart at No. 10, moving into the Top 3 the next week; the album was certified Gold by the BPI for sales exceeding 100,000 copies. During promotion, Kim's band consisted of Ricky Wilde, James Stevenson and later boyfriend Calvin Hayes, who also appeared on the sleeve of the album. Kim later commented that, at that time in the industry, it was passé for a female to attempt to launch a serious career in pop music on her own, and that the backing band had been shown on the sleeve to give credibility to the album. Still, she was accused of trying to copy the allure of US band Blondie. The album was released in North America on 6 April 1982, reaching No. 86 in the US and No. 42 in Canada.

Track listing
All songs written by Ricky Wilde and Marty Wilde, except where noted.
Side one
 "Water on Glass" – 3:31
 "Our Town" – 3:49
 "Everything We Know" – 3:46
 "Young Heroes" – 3:13
 "Kids in America" – 3:27

Side two
 "Chequered Love" – 3:21
 "2-6-5-8-0" – 3:12
 "You'll Never Be So Wrong" – 4:18
 "Falling Out" (R. Wilde) – 4:05
 "Tuning in Tuning On" – 4:27

Bonus tracks (2009 remastered CD edition)
"Shane" ("Chequered Love" B-side) – 4:11
 "Boys" ("Water on Glass" B-side) – 3:31
 "Water on Glass" (7" Version) – 3:32

Personnel 
 Kim Wilde – lead and backing vocals

The Enid 
 Robert John Godfrey – keyboards
 Stephen Stewart – guitars
 Francis Lickerish – guitars
 Martin Russell – bass
 Chris North – drums

Additional musicians 
 Ricky Wilde – keyboards, guitars, backing vocals
 Miffy Smith – keyboards
 James Stevenson – guitars
 Alan Cowley – bass
 Trevor Murrell – drums
 Jake Sollo – percussion
 Gary Barnacle – saxophone (7)
 Luke Tunney – trumpet (7)

Production 
 Ricky Wilde – producer
 Stephen Stewart – engineer 
 Joe Lemay – mastering at Capitol Mastering (Hollywood, California, USA).
 John Pasche – cover design
 Gered Mankowitz – cover photography

Charts

Weekly charts

Year-end charts

Certifications and sales

References

1981 debut albums
Albums recorded at RAK Studios
Kim Wilde albums
New wave albums by English artists
Rak Records albums